The following highways are numbered 532:

Canada
Alberta Highway 532
Manitoba Provincial Road 532
 Ontario Highway 532

India
 National Highway 532 (India)

United States